Gefährliche Fracht is an East German film. It was released in 1954.

External links
 

1954 films
East German films
1950s German-language films
Films directed by Gustav von Wangenheim
German black-and-white films
1950s German films